Sarehole Mill is a Grade II listed water mill, in an area once called Sarehole, on the River Cole in Hall Green, Birmingham, England. It is now run as a museum by the Birmingham Museums Trust. It is known for its association with J. R. R. Tolkien and is one of only two working water mills in Birmingham, with the other being New Hall Mill in Walmley, Sutton Coldfield.

History
Built in 1542 on the site of a previous mill. It was once known as Bedell's or Biddle's Mill after the name of an early owner. In 1727 it was described as High Wheel Mill.

As early as 1755, the mill was leased by Matthew Boulton, one of the pioneers of the Industrial Revolution and leading figure of the Lunar Society for scientific experimentation. It is believed he converted the machinery for use in metal working. As well as milling grain it has been used for grinding bones for fertiliser, metal rolling (Matthew Boulton), tool sharpening and wire drawing.

The current building dates from 1771 and was in use until 1919. Thereafter it fell into a state of disrepair and dereliction. A local community campaign to save the mill was launched when demolition was mooted, and was finally successful with the mill being restored in 1969.

In April 2012 the mill pond was drained to repair the sluice gates, and in the winter of 2012–13 the heavily silted mill pond was dredged.

In 2012/2013 Sarehole Mill underwent a £375,000 overhaul of the roof, chimney, millpond, water wheel and machinery were restored to produce flour again. A newly constructed outdoor bread oven is used regularly to bake bread using the flour ground on site. Sarehole Mill has a team of 10 volunteer millers, 15 volunteer gardeners and eight volunteer guides. The site received 14,383 visitors in 2019.

Flood damage during 2019 prevented the milling of flour on the site, with repairs beginning soon after.

In February 2020, the site's Victorian bakery was restored, and a permanent modern bakery was also installed. Baked goods were made available in the Millers Tea Room, and the original bakery is used for demonstrations of traditional baking techniques.

During the COVID-19 pandemic, the mill was temporarily closed, like all locations managed by the Birmingham Museums Trust but it has now reopened to visitors. The Mill is accessible by guided tour only. There are also Origins of Middle Earth tours available that explore the surrounding area's links to Tolkien.

Steam engine

In 1852 the water wheels at Sarehole Mill were supplemented by a single cylinder steam engine. Although water would have been the primary energy source powering the mill, the addition of a steam engine would have ensured uninterrupted operation of the mill.

The current engine was installed as part of the restoration of the mill in 1975. It was formerly used by a sweet manufacturer, Smith Kendon Ltd, at their factories in England and Messina, Italy, where it was used up until 1948. It was donated to the Birmingham Museum of Science and Industry in 1952 before being moved to Sarehole.

J. R. R. Tolkien

J. R. R. Tolkien lived within 300 yards of the mill at around the turn of century, between the ages four and eight, and would have seen it from his house. The locale at that time was rural Worcestershire farmland and countryside. He has also said that he used the mill as a location in The Lord of the Rings, for the Mill at Hobbiton. In an interview with Guardian journalist, John Ezard in 1966, before the mill's restoration, Tolkien said:

The mill is part of the Shire Country Park.

Sources 
 Birmingham, page 13, Douglas Hickman, 1970, Studio Vista Ltd.
 Hall Green and Hereabout, John Morris JONES, ed. Michael Byrne 1989
  Here and Then – The past of Our District, John Morris JONES,
 A Guide to the Buildings of Birmingham, Peter Leather,

References

External links

 Sarehole Mill Official website
 Shire Country Park
 Birmingham Grid for Learning – very detailed text by John Morris Jones
 The Guardian 1991 article on Sarehole titled Tolkien's shire
 Made in Birmingham
 Sarehole Mill – Service for schools – Educational teaching sessions and resources at Sarehole Mill
 Sarehole Mill for Kids – fun and games for children based on Sarehole Mill

Grade II listed buildings in Birmingham
Industrial buildings completed in 1771
J. R. R. Tolkien
Mill museums in England
Museums in Birmingham, West Midlands
Shire (Middle-earth)
Watermills in England
Birmingham Museums Trust